When Hitler Stole Pink Rabbit is a 2019 German drama film directed by Caroline Link. It is based on the semi-autobiographical novel by Judith Kerr.

Cast
 as Anna Kemper
 as Max Kemper
Carla Juri as Dorothea Kemper
Oliver Masucci as Arthur Kemper
Justus von Dohnányi as Onkel Julius
Ursula Werner as Heimpi

References

External links

2019 drama films
2010s children's films
2010s historical films
German children's films
German historical films
German drama films
Films set in the 1930s
Warner Bros. films
Films based on autobiographical novels
2010s German-language films
Films directed by Caroline Link
2010s German films